Baba Ali (also Romanized as Bābā ‘Alī) is a village in Salehabad Rural District, Salehabad District, Bahar County, Hamadan Province, Iran. At the 2006 census, its population was 584, in 131 families.

References 

Populated places in Bahar County